was the lead vessel in the  heavy cruisers, active in World War II with the Imperial Japanese Navy. These were the largest cruisers in the Japanese fleet, and were intended to form the backbone of a multipurpose long-range strike force.

Background
The Takao-class ships were approved under the 1927 to 1931 supplementary fiscal year budget, and like her sister ships, was named after a mountain. Mount Takao (高雄山) is located outside Kyoto and is not to be confused with the similar Mount Takao (高尾山) located outside Tokyo, or the city of Takao (高雄), in Taiwan.

Design

The Takao-class cruisers were an improved version of the previous  design, incorporating technical elements learned with the development of the experimental light cruiser . They had a distinctive profile with a large, raked main funnel, and a smaller, straight, second funnel. Intended to address issues with the Myōkō class, the Takao class had thicker armor, dual-purpose main guns which could be used against aircraft, and torpedo launchers moved to the upper deck for greater safety. However, as with its predecessors, the Takao class was also top-heavy.

The Takao class displaced .

Propulsion was by 12 Kampon boilers driving four sets of single-impulse geared turbine engines, with four shafts turning three-bladed propellers. The ship was armored with a  side belt, and  armored deck; the bridge was armored with  armored plates.

Takao’s main battery was ten 20 cm/50 3rd Year Type naval guns, the heaviest armament of any heavy cruiser in the world at the time, mounted in five twin turrets. Her secondary armament included eight Type 10 12cm dual purpose guns in four twin mounts on each side, and 16 Type 90 torpedoes in four quadruple launchers. She was very deficient in anti-aircraft capability, with only two  anti-aircraft guns. Takao was repeatedly modernized and upgraded throughout her career in order to counter the growing threat of air strikes, and in her final configuration was armed with ten 20 cm/50 3rd Year Type naval guns (5x2), eight Type 89  dual purpose guns, (4x2), and 16 Type 93 Long Lance torpedoes in four quadruple launchers (plus 8 reloads). Anti-aircraft protection included 24 triple-mount and 12 twin-mount and 26 single-mount Type 96 25 mm AT/AA Guns and four  AA machine guns.

Operational history

Early operations
 
Takao was laid down at the Yokosuka Naval Arsenal on 28 April 1927, launched and named on 12 May 1930, and was commissioned into the Imperial Japanese Navy on 31 May 1932. Although the first ship in her class to be laid down, Atago was actually completed two months earlier.

All of the Takao class were assigned to the Yokosuka Naval District, forming Sentai-4 of the IJN 2nd Fleet, and trained as a unit during the 1930s. She was captained by Captain Chūichi Nagumo from November 1933 – 1934, Captain Eiji Gotō from November 1934 – 1935, Captain Takeo Takagi from December 1936 – 1937 and Captain Tadashige Daigo from December 1937 – 1938. During this time, issues with their stability and seaworthiness due to the top-heavy design became evident. Takao and Atago were rebuilt at the Yokosuka Naval Arsenal between 1938 and 1939, resulting in an improved design: the size of the bridge was reduced, the main mast was relocated aft, and hull bulges were added to improve stability. Maya and Chōkai were not modified as extensively, and can be considered mistakenly as a separate class. After rebuilding was completed, Takao and Atago patrolled off the coast of China in 1940 and early 1941.

Pacific War
At the time of the attack on Pearl Harbor, Takao was commanded by Captain Asakura Bunji and assigned to Vice Admiral Nobutake Kondō's Sentai-4 together with her three sister ships and provided gunfire support for the landings at Lingayen Gulf on Luzon in the Philippines. In February 1942, operating out of Palau, Takao was assigned to intercept shipping escaping from the Netherlands East Indies, sinking the Dutch freighter  Toradja, British minesweeper  and capturing the Dutch freighter Bintoehan on 1 March. On the same day, one of Takao floatplanes bombed the Dutch freighter Enggano. The next night, Takao and Atago overtook the old United States Navy destroyer  and sank her with no survivors. The Royal Australian Navy sloop  defended the convoy for an hour and half, but was sunk. The Japanese cruisers then sank three ships from the convoy: the tanker Francol, the depot ship Anking, and Royal Navy Minesweeper-51. Two Dutch freighters, the 1030 ton Dutch freighter Duymaer van Twist and the 7089 ton freighter Tjisaroea were also captured. Takao, Maya and Atago then returned to Yokosuka for a refit with additional anti-aircraft guns, arriving 18 March.

In April, she participated in the unsuccessful pursuit of the Doolittle raid task force.

Takao rescued 471 crew from the sinking ship .

In June 1942, Takao and Maya supported the invasion of the Aleutian Islands, protecting the convoy for Kiska and providing fire support for landings on Attu. On 3 June 1942, their reconnaissance floatplanes were attacked by USAAF Curtiss P-40 fighters from Umnak and two were shot down; on 5 June, Takao shot down a B-17 Flying Fortress. Takao returned to Ōminato on 24 June.

In August 1942, Takao was assigned to "Operation Ka", the Japanese reinforcement during the Battle of Guadalcanal, departing Hashirajima with Atago and Maya on 11 August for Truk. The cruisers were in the Battle of the Eastern Solomons on 24 August from a distance, and did not see combat.

This was followed by a determined attempt to shell the US base at Henderson Field leading to the Naval Battle of Guadalcanal. All three Japanese ships hit South Dakota multiple times with shells, knocking out her radar and fire controls. Takao and Atago fired Long Lance torpedoes at Washington but missed. However, Kirishima was quickly disabled by Washington and sank a few hours later. Atago was damaged. Takao escaped unharmed, but was forced to retreat to Truk, and from there went back to Kure Naval Arsenal for repairs at the end of November, returning to Truk by the end of December.

In early 1943, Takao supported the evacuation of Guadalcanal. The Japanese transports were successful in evacuating 11,700 troops from the island.

Under the command of Inoguchi Toshihira, Takao operated in the central Pacific from her base at Truk. She returned to Yokosuka Naval Arsenal on 26 July for the installation of additional anti-aircraft guns. After returning to Truk on 23 August, she continued on to Rabaul on 27 August, disembarking army troops and supplies.

In response to American carrier aircraft raiding in the Gilbert Islands, Takao sortied with Vice Admiral Jisaburō Ozawa's fleet to engage the American carriers. Despite extensive searches, this force failed to make contact with the American striking force and returned to Truk.

Takao was refueling at Rabaul when the base was attacked on 5 November 1943 by American carrier aircraft. Takao was forced to return to Yokosuka for dry dock repairs. During the repair work, additional anti-aircraft guns were fitted, along with a Type 21 radar. Repairs were not complete until 18 January 1944.

Takao was assigned to Vice Admiral Ozawa’s First Mobile Fleet based at Palau from 1 March 1944, and was stationed at Davao in the southern Philippines from 1 April. She was attacked by the submarine  on 6 April, but all of her torpedoes missed. On 13 June, during the Battle of the Philippine Sea, Takao was part of Vice Admiral Takeo Kurita’s Mobile Force Vanguard, deployed from Tawi Tawi in an attempt to force the American 5th Fleet into a "decisive battle" off of Saipan. In what came to be called the "Great Marianas Turkey Shoot", Japanese aircraft attacking US Task Force 58 off Saipan suffered severe losses. On 26 June Takao was again at Kure Naval Arsenal, where yet more anti-aircraft guns were installed, as well as a Type 13 air-search radar.

Takao returned to Singapore in mid-July and conducted operations in the vicinity of Singapore and Brunei until mid-October. On 22 October, Takao sortied from Brunei as part of Admiral Kurita's Center Force for the Battle of Leyte Gulf. In the predawn hours of 23 October, the Japanese force was intercepted by two American submarines in the Palawan Passage. Atago and Maya were both sunk in the same engagement. Chōkai was lost a few days later at the Battle off Samar, leaving Takao as the sole survivor of her class.

Takao was assessed as being unrepairable at Singapore and impossible to tow to Japan. She was therefore moored as a floating anti-aircraft battery defending Seletar Naval Base along with Myōkō, the latter crippled at the Battle of the Sibuyan Sea and then further damaged by a submarine-launched torpedo.

After penetrating the harbor defenses, XE3 maneuvered under Takao, where diver Acting Leading Seaman James Joseph Magennis exited the submarine and attached six limpet mines to Takaos hull using an improvised piece of rope (the hull was covered with a thick layer of seaweed, and the magnets of the limpet mines would not hold them on the hull); when the mines exploded, they blew a hole . Several compartments below the lower deck were flooded, including two ammunition magazines, the main gun plotting room and the lower communications room. Fraser and Magennis were awarded the Victoria Cross.

It was discovered after the end of the war that Takao was manned by a skeleton crew and had no ammunition aboard for her 8-inch main armament. Japanese forces surrendered Seletar Naval Base to the British on 21 September 1945. She was removed from the navy list on 3 May 1947.

References

Notes

Books

External links

 

Takao-class cruisers
Ships built by Yokosuka Naval Arsenal
1930 ships
Second Sino-Japanese War cruisers of Japan
World War II cruisers of Japan
Ships of the Aleutian Islands campaign
World War II shipwrecks in the Strait of Malacca
Ships sunk as targets
Maritime incidents in 1946